William Hewat McLeod (1932–2009; also Hew McLeod) was a New Zealand scholar who helped establish Sikh Studies as a distinctive field.

Considered to be the most prominent Western historian of Sikhism, his publications had introduced higher criticism to Sikh sources for the first time and influenced generations of scholars. However, his scholarship remains controversial among traditional Khalsa scholars, who accuse him of disrespecting the religion and argue that Sikhism can't be studied using Western methodologies.

Career 
McLeod attended the Nelson College from 1946 to 1950, before joining the University of Otago, where he earned a BA. He earned an MA in history from the same college, graduating in 1955 with a 2nd Class Honours. McLeod enrolled for theological studies at the Knox College and in 1958, joined the New Zealand Presbyterian Church, apparently out of a desire to serve the less privileged. McLeod was deputed to Kharar in Punjab, India to teach English at a higher secondary school.

During this stay, McLeod learned vernacular languages (Hindi and Punjabi) and became interested in Sikhs. In 1963, he enrolled for a PhD at the School of Oriental and African Studies under Arthur Llewellyn Basham and returned two years later upon a successful completion. He was appointed as a lecturer in Punjab History at the Baring Union Christian College, the same year. In 1968, The Clarendon Press published his thesis, establishing his reputation as a scholar and marking the beginning of his research career.

In 1969, he left his job at India (and the Presbyterian Church) with a new-found atheism. From 1969 to 1970, he was the Smuts Memorial Fellow for Commonwealth Studies at the University of Cambridge and from 1970 to 1971, the Leverhulme Visiting Fellow for Precolonial History at the University of Sussex. In 1971, he was appointed as a lecturer of history at the University of Otago. He would hold the post till retiring in 1997.

All along this while, he oft-visited India, researched and wrote extensively about Sikh scriptures, literature, identity, and history. From 1988 to 1993, McLeod also taught a one-term course at University of Toronto and supervised several PhDs. From 1997 to 1998, he held a visiting fellowship at Balliol College, Oxford.

Honors 
In 1986, McLeod was chosen to deliver a series of public lectures on religion, sponsored by the American Council of Learned Societies (ACLS). In 1990 the University of London awarded him a DLit. He was elected a Fellow of the Royal Society of New Zealand in 1999.

Personal life 
McLeod was born on 2 August 1932 to a farming family near Feilding. In May 1955 he married Margaret Wylie, whom he had met during his university days. They have four children — Rory, Michael, Shaun, and Ruth (half-Punjabi; adopted during his PhD days).

On 2 February 1987, during the ACLS lecture series, he suffered a stroke; this significantly affected his ability to lecture and argue orally. McLeod recovered within a year and half.

Published works and reception

Monographs

Guru Nanak and the Sikh Religion 
In his PhD thesis (later published by OUP), McLeod introduced the tools of higher criticism and philology to Sikh janamsakhis and concluded them to have little reliable information. The janamsakhis were apparently written by Nanak's followers, after about a century of his death, to reflect their perceptions of him; McLeod's objective account of Nanak's life had only three paragraphs.

Simon Digby, for the Indian Economic and Social History Review, noted the work to be an important, rich, and rigorous study. A review in Archiv Orientální found his work to be the product of painstaking research and responsible approach, supplying a wealth of information on Nanak. Khushwant Singh, reviewing for The Journal of Asian Studies, admired McLeod's dispassionate objectivity in producing an exceptional scholarship; his exhaustive reading of primary sources and methodology of source criticism was lauded in particular.

Christopher Shackle notes that McLeod's questioning the historicity of previously unchallenged "facts" created a predictable ruffle among orthodox Sikhs. However, the work had exhibited a naive reductionist understanding of the links between hagiography and historical biography, and created a dead-end for scholars not willing to align with the Khalsa-centric school. S.C.R. Weightman had a mixed opinion.

J.S. Grewal took a critical view of the book. While considering Guru Nanak to consider both Hindu and Muslim beliefs as wrong, and Sikhism to be distinct from both, as opposed to a synthesis, he categorized the faith as a "reworking of the sant synthesis," despite the explicit statements of Nanak delineating the start of a new panth with new traditions, and leaving this unaccounted.

Tony Ballantyne commends the study for introducing "rigorous professionalism" into discourse on Sikh history. Published a year before Guru Nanak's fifth birth-centenary, McLeod ran contrary to the "reverential and even hagiographical tone" of volumes that had flooded the market and his textualist methodology "transformed" the field. Harjot Oberoi opines that the entire field of Sikh Studies should remain indebted to McLeod's pioneering book. A 2009 editorial of Sikh Formations noted the work to be a seminal and highly influential contribution to the field. Pashaura Singh (along with Michael Hawley and Susan Prill) note that McLeod's work remains the best in expounding Nanak's teachings.

Early Sikh Tradition: A Study of the Janamsakhis 
This was written in 1971 but first published in 1980 by The Clarendon Press.

Christopher Shackle, in a review for Journal of the Royal Asiatic Society, found the work to be formidable in its pioneer borrowing of higher criticism from Biblical studies; it was far more sophisticated than his 1968 volume and was among the rare examples of major scholarship arising out of traditionally neglected areas. Surjit Hans noted that McLeod's knowledge of the Janamsakhis, as exhibited in the work, was unrivaled. So did Christine Moliner.

Shackle later noted that the political turbulence in Punjab since the 80s meant that McLeod's best work failed to receive its deserved attention among scholars. Pashaura Singh (along with Michael Hawley and Susan Prill) note it to provide a comprehensive analysis of the hagiographical cannon of janamsakhis.

Sikhs of the Khalsa: A History of the Khalsa Rahit 
His last significant work, it was noted by Christopher Shackle to be the last word on the question of development of Sikh Identity.

Essay Volumes

The Evolution of the Sikh Community 
In 1975, McLeod published The Evolution of the Sikh Community, a collection of five essays.

Clive Dewey was effusive in his praise of the work; even if McLeod had written nothing else, this "bravura performance"  was sufficient to establish his unprecedented caliber in the field of Sikh Studies. J.S. Grewal was again critical of his approach.

The Sikhs: History, Religion, and Society 
There were seven essays, five of which were reprints of the ACLS lectures. The compilation was published by Columbia University Press in 1989.

Christopher Shackle, in a review for Journal of the Royal Asiatic Society, found the volume to be a must-read for all students of Sikh History. McLeod's willingness to critique his earlier stances and his fluency in recent scholarship were admired. Shackle found the second essay to be the "most stimulating", where McLeod used newer evidence to convincingly reject the popularly ascribed roles of Islam in development of Sikhism.

Who is a Sikh? The Problems of the Sikh Identity 
Published in 1990 by the Oxford University Press, this collated ten essays delivered during the 1986-87 Radhakrishnan Lecture at Oxford University.

Christopher Shackle, in a review for Journal of the Royal Asiatic Society, found the work to be quite good but poorer to his The Sikhs: History, Religion, and Society. Both W. Owen Cole (reviewing for Journal of the Royal Asiatic Society) and Surjit Hans (reviewing for Studies in History) found the book to be a mandatory read for anyone having an interest in Sikh identity. Bruce La Brack, reviewing for Journal of Asian Studies, noted that the volume re-proved why McLeod was the leading scholar of Sikh Studies in West.

Translation

The Chaupa Singh Rahit-nama 
Christopher Shackle, in a review for Journal of the Royal Asiatic Society, found the work to cement McLeod's reputation as the preeminent scholar of Sikh Studies. The detailed notes accompanying the text and McLeod's introduction detailing the historical development of the text were particularly praised.

Bibliography

Textual Sources for the Study of Sikhism 
Christopher Shackle found the work to "ably" present the fundamental texts of Sikh tradition. Pashaura Singh (along with Michael Hawley and Susan Prill) found it to be a good selection of texts.

References

Historical Dictionary of Sikhism 
It was first published in 1995, under the editorship of McLeod. A second edition appeared in 2002 by Oxford University Press. A third edition was published in 2014 by Scarecrow Press alone;  Louis Fenech was roped in as co-editor.

In 2006, Simon Barrett reviewed the second edition. In 2009, Michael Hawley reviewed the same edition to be a useful and reliable reference for Sikh scholars, containing "clearly written" and "informative" definitions. However, certain expected entries were skipped or were too short and the cross-referencing was poor; the dictionary was also in the need of an update to accommodate diaspora Sikhs.

Collections

Exploring Sikhism: Aspects of Sikh Identity, Culture, and Thought 
Published by Oxford University Press in 2007, it contains sixteen previously published essays.

In a review for Nova Religio, George Adams noted an exhaustive examination of all important aspects of the Sikh tradition in a lucid and convincing manner. Daniel Gold, reviewing for The Indian Economic & Social History Review, praised McLeod as the foremost Western historian of Sikhism, whose "careful scholarship and thoughtful analytic temper" were visible across all essays; the volume was authoritative and remained accessible to scholars as well as laymen.

Sikhs and Sikhism 
An omnibus volume, it was published by Oxford University Press as hardback in 1999 and reissued in 2004. It comprises four works — Guru Nanak and the Sikh Religion, Early Sikh Tradition: A Study of the Janamsakhis, The Evolution of the Sikh Community, and Who is a Sikh? The Problems of the Sikh Identity.

Frederick M. Smith remarked in a review that despite methodological advances in the field, the omnibus was a must-read for all scholars of religion. Christopher Shackle noted that the omnibus has already established itself as the standard reference work.

Essays in Sikh History, Tradition, and Society 
A collation of his most significant essays, the collection was published by Oxford University Press in 2007.

Notes

References

External links 
 

1932 births
2009 deaths
People from Feilding
People educated at Nelson College
University of Otago alumni
Alumni of SOAS University of London
Academic staff of the University of Otago
20th-century New Zealand historians
Scholars of Sikhism
Fellows of the Royal Society of New Zealand